Mayor Synagogue is a former synagogue in the Hasköy district of Beyoğlu, Istanbul, Turkey.

History
According to historian Lorans Tanatar Baruh, the synagogue was built in the Byzantine era and was called Mayor because it was the largest in the neighborhood. Another historian claims the synagogue was built 300 to 500 years ago by Jews from Majorca. (According to historian Jak Deleon, in the 1950s there was a Mayorka Synagogue in Hasköy.)

The synagogue building is now used as storage space, workshops, and a billiard parlor. In September 2009, artist Serge Spitzer chose this site for his installation Molecular Istanbul.

See also
History of the Jews in Turkey
List of synagogues in Turkey
Mayor Synagogue (Bursa)

References

External links
Serge Spitzer: Molecular Istanbul, Mayor Synagogue, Istanbul. VernissageTV, 28 September 2009. Video includes many interior and exterior views of the structure.
 New Publication  Serge Spitzer / Molecular (ISTANBUL)
  Internet site 

Synagogues in Istanbul
Golden Horn
Beyoğlu
Billiard halls
Sephardi Jewish culture in Turkey